Crimson II is the eighth and final full-length studio album by Swedish death metal band Edge of Sanity and is a continuation of the storyline first heard on the album Crimson (1996). It is the only Edge of Sanity release that does not feature original members Andreas Axelsson, Sami Nerberg, Anders Lindberg and Benny Larsson. It also doesn't feature Opeth frontman Mikael Åkerfeldt, who was the special guest on Crimson 'I'. Instead, it features contributions from guest musicians Mike Wead, Jonas Granvik, and brothers Roger and Simon Johannson.

Released during the advent of online music piracy, the album was indexed into over 40 track splits on the CD pressings, running from 18 seconds to a minute and a half, to discourage ripping and sharing (despite software like iTunes having the ability to rip groups of tracks as one file). When it was later released to digital stores and streaming services, the album was indexed into 9 tracks that are not all split according to the song movements; this caused the movement names to be extended with "Aftermath II" and "III" even though only the final two tracks contain the movement itself. Neither Swanö nor label Black Mark Production have commented on why this is the case or why the edited version was used.

The album was remixed and slightly edited for the compilation When All Is Said (2006) so it would fit on one CD. Full versions of both songs were used for a combined vinyl release in 2003. For this, the song was split in half, with side 2 picking up at "Achilles Heel." In 2011, it was reissued on "ice blue" vinyl but used the digital release as the audio source, as each section of the songs fade in and out at the exact times they do in the Amazon MP3 release.

The album is dedicated to the memory of Death frontman Chuck Schuldiner.

Track listing 
Note: Although the album consists of one 43-minute-long song, it really is split up into 9 movements.

Digital Edition
To further confusion, the digital release of the album uses the When All Is Said remix/edit and splits it differently, causing some movement times to shift out of alignment. Most of the tracks also fade in and out at the beginning/end.

Personnel 
 Dan Swanö − lead and backing vocals, all other instruments, production, mixing, engineering
 Roger Johansson − lead vocals
 Jonas Granvik − backing vocals
 Mike Wead − lead guitar, engineering
 Simon Johansson − lead guitar

References 

2003 albums
Edge of Sanity albums
Albums with cover art by Kristian Wåhlin
Concept albums
Albums produced by Dan Swanö
Sequel albums